Brent Bommentre (born May 10, 1984) is an American former competitive ice dancer. With partner Kimberly Navarro, he is the 2008 Four Continents bronze medalist and a two-time (2008 & 2009) U.S. national bronze medalist.

Personal life 
Bommentre was born May 10, 1984 in Chestnut Hill, Philadelphia. He attended Drexel University. He graduated from U.C. Berkley's Haas School of Business with a degree in Business Administration and a minor in Global Development in 2019. He has two younger sisters, Ashley and Brianne. He married Karen Casperson on July 4, 2020 and they reside in Hailey, Idaho.

Career
Bommentre was the manager of Black Tie Ski Rentals of Sun Valley from December 2019- April 2020 in Ketchum, Idaho. The company provides premier ski rentals and delivery services to the Sun Valley area.

Skating Career 
Early in his career, Bommentre competed with Allison Seitchik and Kirsten Frisch. He teamed up with Kendra Goodwin in the spring of 2003. They won the pewter medal at the 2004 U.S. Championships and competed at the 2004 Skate America and the 2004 Cup of Russia. Goodwin and Bommentre announced the end of their partnership in March 2005.

Bommentre teamed up with Kimberly Navarro after a tryout in April 2005. They won the bronze medal at the 2008 U.S. Championships, and were chosen to represent the United States at the 2008 Four Continents, where they finished in 3rd, and the 2008 World Championships in Gothenburg, Sweden, where they were 12th. At the 2009 Nationals, Navarro/Bommentre again finished 3rd, but were left off the Worlds team in favor of Tanith Belbin / Benjamin Agosto, who had missed U.S. Nationals due to injury. They did compete at the 2009 Four Continents, where they finished in sixth place.

In the Olympic season, Navarro/Bommentre finished 4th at U.S. Nationals, and were not named to the Olympic team. When Belbin/Agosto ended their competitive career following the Olympics, they were selected to compete at the 2010 World Championships. They were 14th in their second Worlds appearance. Navarro/Bommentre announced their retirement from competition on May 11, 2010. They perform with the Ice Theatre of New York and, in November 2012, they taped an appearance in an episode of Glee. In Bommentre's professional skating career he has performed with Holiday On Ice, Broadway on Ice, Sun Valley On Ice, the 2014 Olympic Tour of Stars On Ice, and Nancy Kerrigan's "Halloween On Ice." He has also performed in the Disson television skating specials "Shall We Dance On Ice" and "Colgate Skating and Gymnastics." Bommentre also competed as part of the act "Aerial Ice" on the quarter-finals of NBC's America's Got Talent.

He has been a principal performer and figure skating instructor since age 15 and loves coaching kids and adults. He has instructed students ranging from 4 to 75 years old with over 4,000 cumulative hours of instruction. Bommentre has helped students through over 500 dance tests, resulting in 12 Gold Medals and three placements on internationally ranked collegiate synchronized skating teams. He frequently comes to Minnesota to help skaters and coach. 
He has performed as a principal soloist for over 1.5 million resort guests across ten years and 100 shows.

Programs

With Navarro

With Goodwin

With Frisch

Results 
GP: Grand Prix; JGP: Junior Grand Prix

With Navarro

With Goodwin

With Frisch

References

External links

 
 
 
 

American male ice dancers
1984 births
Living people
Sportspeople from Philadelphia
Four Continents Figure Skating Championships medalists